Mathilde Rosa (born 28 January 1997) is an Italian female canoeist who won nine medals at senior level at the Wildwater Canoeing World Championships.

References

External links
 

1997 births
Living people
Italian female canoeists